The music of Oman has been strongly affected by the country's coastal location, with Omani sailors interacting with, and bringing back music from, Egypt, Tanzania and elsewhere. More recently, a Portuguese occupation has left its own marks, while geographic neighbors like the United Arab Emirates, Yemen, Saudi Arabia and Iran have also had a profound influence. In contrast to other Arab countries, Omani traditional music has a strong emphasis on rhythm.

Traditional music marks all the stages in the life of an Omani, including birth, circumcision, marriage and death. In contrast to many Arab countries, all Omanis participate in music, men and women, young and old.

Liwa and Fann at-Tanbura are types of music and dance performed mainly in communities of descendants of Bantu peoples from the African Great Lakes region.

The Omani Centre for Traditional Music claims that Arabic music in Oman can be characterized by "tetrachords with typical Arabic intervals, including three-quarter tones taken from the Arabic musical scales; the maqamat".

Notable Omani musicians include Salim Rashid Suri, the "Singing Sailor", a 20th-century singer and oud player from Sur who combined strains of the ṣawt of the northern Persian Gulf and other musical traditions of the Indian Ocean as a pioneer of the genre called Ṣawt al-Khaleej ("Voice of the Gulf").

There is also a very small underground metal scene with bands like Arabia and Belos emerging from there, the former moving to the UK.

See also 

 Culture of Oman

Notes

References
OCTM - Melodic instruments
Traditional Arts in Southern Arabia. Music and Society in Sohar, Sultanate of Oman / Dieter Christensen, Salwa El-Shawan Castelo-Branco.- Intercultural Music Studies Vol. 14, 248 p., 118 photos, graphics and musical transcriptions, 2 CDs + 1 DVD.
 (fr) Maho Sebiane, « Dieter Christensen et Salwa El-Shawan Castelo-Branco : Traditional Arts in Southern Arabia. Music and Society in Sohar, Sultanate of Oman » Book review , Chroniques yéménites 17 |  2012]
 (fr) Maho Sebiane, "Entre l’Afrique et l’Arabie : les esprits de possession sawahili et leurs frontières", Journal des africanistes, 84-2 | 2014, 48-79.
 (en) Maho Sebiane, Beyond the leiwah of Eastern Arabia Structure of a possession rite in the longue durée, Música em Contexto, Brasília Nº. 1 (2017): 13-44
 (fr) Maho Sebiane "Nuisances et chaos des Vents. Expressions de l’agressivité dans un rite de possession en Arabie orientale", Cahiers d’ethnomusicologie 33, 2020: 113-131